Červené Janovice is a municipality and village in Kutná Hora District in the Central Bohemian Region of the Czech Republic. It has about 700 inhabitants.

Administrative parts
Villages of Chvalov, Lány, Plhov, Vilémovice, Zadní and Zhoř are administrative parts of Červené Janovice.

Geography
It lies in the Upper Sázava Hills. The territory is rich in ponds, supplied by minor watercourses.

History
The first written mention of Červené Janovice is from 1352. It was called Janovičky up to the 18th century. From 1724, the village was owned by the town of Kutná Hora.

Sights
An important monument is the Červené Janovice Castle. It was originally a Gothic fortress, rebuilt in the Renaissance style in the early 17th century, then it was rebuilt into the early Baroque castle in 1646–1660.

The Church of Saint Martin was built in the in the Neo-Romanesque style in 1909–1911.

The Church of the Nativity of the Virgin Mary is located in Vilémovice. It was originally a late Romanesque building from the second half of the 13th century, reconstructed in the 18th and 19th centuries.

Gallery

References

External links

Villages in Kutná Hora District